Sandimetsa is a village in Väike-Maarja Parish, Lääne-Viru County in Estonia.

References

Villages in Lääne-Viru County